Sławomir Chrzanowski (born 24 January 1969) is a Polish former cyclist. He competed in the men's individual road race at the 1996 Summer Olympics.

References

External links
 

1969 births
Living people
Polish male cyclists
Olympic cyclists of Poland
Cyclists at the 1996 Summer Olympics
People from Dzierżoniów
20th-century Polish people
21st-century Polish people